The Bucher's Mill Covered Bridge or Butcher's Mill Covered Bridge is a covered bridge that spans Cocalico Creek in Lancaster County, Pennsylvania, United States.  After the Landis Mill Covered Bridge, it is the second shortest covered bridge in the county.  A county-owned and maintained bridge, its official designation is the Cocalico #2 Bridge.

The bridge has a single span, wooden, double Burr arch trusses design with the addition of steel hanger rods.  The deck is made from oak planks.  It is painted red, the traditional color of Lancaster County covered bridges, on both the inside and outside.  Both approaches to the bridge are painted in the traditional white color.

The bridge's WGCB Number is 38-36-12.  In 1980 it was added to the National Register of Historic Places as structure number 80003514.  It is located at  (40.20783, -76.134667) to the northeast of Ephrata, Pennsylvania off Pennsylvania Route 272 on Cocalico Creek Road.

History 
The Bucher's Mill Covered Bridge was built in 1891Note:  by Elias McMellen, using single span, wooden, double Burr arch truss construction,  at a cost of $1167.  A year later, in 1892, the bridge was damaged heavily in a flood and was rebuilt by McMellen for $1025. At only 64 feet long, it is one of the shortest covered bridges in Lancaster County, Pennsylvania.

Gallery

See also
 List of bridges on the National Register of Historic Places in Pennsylvania
 List of covered bridges in Lancaster County, Pennsylvania
 National Register of Historic Places listings in Lancaster County, Pennsylvania

References 

Bridges completed in 1891
Covered bridges on the National Register of Historic Places in Pennsylvania
Covered bridges in Lancaster County, Pennsylvania
1891 establishments in Pennsylvania
National Register of Historic Places in Lancaster County, Pennsylvania
Road bridges on the National Register of Historic Places in Pennsylvania
Wooden bridges in Pennsylvania
Burr Truss bridges in the United States